The Mvoti River is a river in the KwaZulu-Natal region of South Africa. The Mvoti River, in the vicinity of KwaDukuza, is subjected to extensive water abstraction, which is then utilised for irrigation, industrial use, urban water requirements and various domestic uses by informal settlements.

The Mvoti estuary is situated north of the coastal city of Durban. The river is approximately 197 km long with a catchment area of 2829 km2.

The river is named after headman Mvoti Ncashange, of the L'la clan (the people of rest), who settled on the banks of this river.

References

Rivers of KwaZulu-Natal